The 2021–22 Scottish Women's Football Championship is the inaugural season of the SWF Championship after its formation as the third tier of women's football in Scotland.

The previous two planned seasons in 2020 and 2020–21 were both abandoned due to the coronavirus pandemic.

The league was split into two divisions – Championship North and Championship South. Planned to have 'approximately 12 teams each', the divisions in the inaugural season actually contained 9 and 17 teams respectively.

Montrose secured the Championship North title on 10 April, with a 4–1 win over their promotion rivals East Fife. In the Championship South, Gartcairn finished as the division winners on 24 April, ahead of 2nd-placed Rossvale. East Fife won the third available promotion place to SWPL 2, by winning the single-match promotion play-off in Alloa, 3–1, against Rossvale on 8 May.

Teams

Championship North

Source:

Notes

Championship South

Source:

Notes

SWPL play-offs
For the first time, a system of promotion/relegation play-offs was introduced to the SWPL. The two runners-up from Championship North and Championship South were intended to take part in play-off semi-finals, with the winner playing the team finishing eighth in SWPL2 in the play-off final, to determine the last place in the 2022–23 SWPL. Instead, East Fife won promotion in a single promotion play-off, and no club was relegated from SWPL 2, due to expansion of the SWPL in 2022.

References

External links
 Championship North at SWF
 Championship South at SWF

Scot
Scottish Women's Football Championship seasons
Championship